The 67th David di Donatello ceremony, presented by the Accademia del Cinema Italiano, honored the best in Italian cinema released from 1 March 2021 to 28 February 2022 at Cinecittà Studios in Rome. The ceremony was hosted by presenters Carlo Conti and Drusilla Foer.

Drama film The Hand of God won five awards, including Best Film. Meanwhile, historical-fantasy film Freaks Out won the most awards with six.

Winners and nominees

Winners are listed first, highlighted in boldface, and indicated with a double dagger (‡). The nominations were announced on 4 April 2022.

Films with multiple nominations and awards

References

External links

David di Donatello
David
May 2022 events in Italy